Jim Marshall is a former American football coach. He served as the head football coach at the University of Richmond from 1989 to 1994 and at the University of Tennessee at Martin from 1997 to 1999, compiling a career college football record of 21–78.

Head coaching record

References

Year of birth missing (living people)
Living people
American football centers
Alabama State Hornets football coaches
Arkansas State Red Wolves football coaches
Bowling Green Falcons football players
Incarnate Word Cardinals football coaches
Louisiana Tech Bulldogs football coaches
Memphis Tigers football coaches
North Alabama Lions football coaches
Richmond Spiders football coaches
UT Martin Skyhawks football coaches
UT Martin Skyhawks football players
Tulane Green Wave football coaches
UTEP Miners football coaches
UTSA Roadrunners football coaches
Wyoming Cowboys football coaches